Corynophora is a genus of moths of the family Crambidae.

Species
Corynophora argentifascia (Hampson, 1919)
Corynophora lativittalis (Walker, 1863)
Corynophora torrentellus (Meyrick, 1879)

References

Crambinae
Crambidae genera